The 1982 East Texas State Lions football team represented East Texas State University—now known as Texas A&M University–Commerce—as a member of the Lone Star Conference (LSC) during the 1982 NCAA Division II football season. Led by 19th-year head coach Ernest Hawkins, the Lions compiled an overall record of 6–4 with a mark of 4–3 in conference play, placing in a four-way tie for second in the LSC. East Texas State played home games at Memorial Stadium in Commerce, Texas.

Schedule

Postseason awards

All-Americans
Kyle Mackey, Honorable Mention Quarterback

All-Lone Star Conference

LSC First Team
Ben Boston, Defensive Back
Ricky Dirks, Running Back 
Kyle Mackey, Quarterback 
Peter Roos, Offensive Tackle

LSC Second Team
Javier Cardenas, Tight End 
David Lowe, Defensive End 
Burl Perry, Center

LSC Honorable Mention
Chris Flynn, Defensive Back
Randy Jones, Punter
Kevin Rush, Linebacker 
Vaughn Williamson, Offensive Guard

References

East Texas State
Texas A&M–Commerce Lions football seasons
East Texas State football